Hou or HOU may refer to:

 -hou, a place-name element
 Hou (surname)
 Hou (currency), a unit of currency in Greater China
 Hou (Odder Municipality), a town in Denmark
 Hou (title), a title in ancient China
 Denglong (mythology) or Hou, a Chinese legendary creature
 Hands-On Universe, an educational program
 Hellenic Open University, in Patras, Greece
 Hero of Ukraine
 Hounslow railway station (National Rail station code: HOU), London, England
 A common abbreviation for the U.S. city of Houston, Texas and its major professional sports teams:
 Houston Astros, the city's Major League Baseball team
 Houston Rockets, the city's National Basketball Association team
 Houston Texans, the city's National Football League team
 HOU, IATA code for William P. Hobby Airport

See also
 Ho (disambiguation)